Natasha Rigby is an Australian soccer player who plays for the Perth Glory in the W-league.

Rigby grew up in Margaret River, a small town south of Perth. There was no girls' soccer team, and she played with the boys. She moved to Perth to study sports science at university, and was given an opportunity with the Glory for the 2016–17 W-League season. She started as a squad member, and worked her way on to the bench and finally into the starting team.

Rigby played a role in Glory's 2016–17 run to the grand final, which they lost to Melbourne City.

Following Sam Kerr's move from Perth to Europe, Rigby took over the role of captain for the 2019–20 season.

For the 2020–21 W-League, the national competition was heavily disrupted due to travel restrictions and quarantine requirements caused by COVID-19, as well as the exodus of many top level Australian players to the FA Women's Super League. Rigby was required to manage her commitment to full time employment as a prison officer at a women's prison with her footballing career.

Beyond football, Rigby engages in charitable work to improve literacy amongst Indigenous Australians, and supports mental health initiatives in the community.

References 

Perth Glory FC (A-League Women) players
Living people
Australian women's soccer players
Year of birth missing (living people)
Women's association footballers not categorized by position